WHOP-FM (98.7 MHz) is a radio station broadcasting an adult contemporary format. Licensed to and serving Hopkinsville, Kentucky, United States, the station serves the Clarksville, Tennessee-Hopkinsville, Kentucky area. The station is owned by Forcht Broadcasting, and is a sister station to WHOP (AM). The two stations share studios located at 220 Buttermilk Road on the west side of Hopkinsville.

History 
The station signed on the air as WHOP-FM in May 1948. It was the first FM station to sign on in the Clarksville/Hopkinsville radio market area, and the whole westernmost segment of Kentucky. Paducah's WPAD-FM (now WDDJ) and WKYX-FM signed on in the months after. WHOP-FM began broadcasting as a simulcast of its AM sister station WHOP. However, in 1958, the station became a separate operation by changing its callsign to WRLX, and beginning broadcasting an easy listening format. It was the first attempt in Kentucky at full separate FM programming since the early 1950s demise of early FM stations in the Louisville area.

The station reverted its callsign back to WHOP-FM to match its AM sister station at some time between 1970 and 1974. Upon the callsign change, the station began broadcasting a country format. In the mid-2000s, in response to the station’s overwhelming competition against WVVR and Cadiz’s WKDZ-FM, both of which were and still are broadcasting the same format, WHOP-FM changed to its current soft adult contemporary format, and rebranded as Lite 98.7.

Programming
Along with its soft AC format, the station also features programming from CBS News Radio and Premiere Radio Networks.

The WHOP stations both serve as two of three affiliates in the Clarksville/Hopkinsville market that serves as an affiliate of the University of Kentucky Wildcats sports radio network, broadcasting football and men's basketball games involving that school's athletic teams. WKDZ-FM in Cadiz is the other station in the area that also serve as UK Sports Network affiliates.

WHOP-HD2
On February 6, 2023, WHOP-FM launched a country music format on its HD2 subchannel, branded as "95.3 The Farm".

References

External links
WHOP-FM Website

HOP-FM
Radio stations established in 1948
Mainstream adult contemporary radio stations in the United States
Hopkinsville, Kentucky
1948 establishments in Kentucky